Audrey Wollen (born 1992, in Los Angeles, CA) is an American writer, critic, and artist. Wollen's prose and criticism gained traction on social media while she developed the notion of "Sad Girl Theory": the idea that routines and tropes of female sadness, self-loathing, and abjectness might lead to bodily and emancipatory revolt. Wollen has written for The Nation, The New York Review of Books, Artforum, Bookforum, Frieze, and The New York Times, and has exhibited at the Museum of Modern Art Warsaw, the Barischer Kunstverein, and Steve Turner Gallery. She lives and works in New York.

Early life and education 
Wollen was born and raised in Los Angeles, California. Her mother is writer and artist Leslie Dick and her father is filmmaker Peter Wollen. 

Wollen graduated with a BFA from CalArts in 2015 and is working on a PhD at The Graduate Center, CUNY.

Writing and Art 
Wollen has reviewed books by novelists Anne Carson, Kate Zambreno, Katherine Anne Porter, Annie Ernaux, and Clarice Lispector and has covered artists Elsie Wright and Frances Griffiths, Amalia Ulman, Richard Prince, Lana del Rey, and Alina Szapocznikow. 

In 2018, Wollen and Leslie Dick organized a window installation of books, according to her biographer Jason McBride, that influenced writer and poet Kathy Acker. Books include ones she reproduced, rewrote, appropriated, and "pirated" into her own texts from her various apartments in New York, London, and San Francisco. This was in conjunction with Focus on Kathy Acker, an East Village Series at Performance Space New York

In 2021, Wollen wrote a passage on the late artist Kaari Upson, whom Wollen worked for as a studio archivist .

Sad Girl Theory
Wollen's Sad Girl Theory began as a research project that looked at the cultural trope of the suicidal woman. Sad Girl Theory articulates that the suffering woman is a political agent whose refusal to make amends with her sadness and suffering is an act of revolt. Thus, Sad Girl Theory proposes routine female sadness and bodily stress as a general state of social/political opposition. Sad Girl Theory is based on the notion that a women’s sadness and its saturation on the body might be an active, autonomous, and articulate form of resistance. Sad Girl Theory can be considered an academic response to the liberal and neoliberal feminist ideal that views women as the makers of their own success. 

Sad Girl Theory provided inspiration for artist and writer Johanna Hedva's Sick Woman Theory, a project focused on chronic illness as an embodied form of political protest. Hedva claims, in response to Wollen's work, that she "was mainly concerned with the question of what happens to the sad girl who is poor, queer, and/or not white when, if, she grows up."

References 

Living people
Feminist theorists
Feminist artists
1992 births
American women writers
American women critics
Social media influencers